In geometry, every polyhedron is associated with a second dual structure, where the vertices of one correspond to the faces of the other, and the edges between pairs of vertices of one correspond to the edges between pairs of faces of the other. Such dual figures remain combinatorial or abstract polyhedra, but not all can also be constructed as geometric polyhedra. Starting with any given polyhedron, the dual of its dual is the original polyhedron.

Duality preserves the symmetries of a polyhedron. Therefore, for many classes of polyhedra defined by their symmetries, the duals belong to a corresponding symmetry class. For example, the regular polyhedrathe (convex) Platonic solids and (star) Kepler–Poinsot polyhedraform dual pairs, where the regular tetrahedron is self-dual. The dual of an isogonal polyhedron (one in which any two vertices are equivalent under symmetries of the polyhedron) is an isohedral polyhedron (one in which any two faces are equivalent [...]), and vice versa. The dual of an isotoxal polyhedron (one in which any two edges are equivalent [...]) is also isotoxal.

Duality is closely related to polar reciprocity, a geometric transformation that, when applied to a convex polyhedron, realizes the dual polyhedron as another convex polyhedron.

Kinds of duality

There are many kinds of duality. The kinds most relevant to elementary polyhedra are polar reciprocity and topological or abstract duality.

Polar reciprocation

In Euclidean space, the dual of a polyhedron  is often defined in terms of polar reciprocation about a sphere. Here, each vertex (pole) is associated with a face plane (polar plane or just polar) so that the ray from the center to the vertex is perpendicular to the plane, and the product of the distances from the center to each is equal to the square of the radius.

When the sphere has radius  and is centered at the origin (so that it is defined by the equation ), then the polar dual of a convex polyhedron  is defined as

Typically when no sphere is specified in the construction of the dual, then the unit sphere is used, meaning  in the above definitions.

For each face plane of  described by the linear equation

the corresponding vertex of the dual polyhedron  will have coordinates . For example, if an edge of  contains a vertex, the corresponding edge of  will be contained in the corresponding face.

For a polyhedron with a center of symmetry, it is common to use a sphere centered on this point, as in the Dorman Luke construction (mentioned below). Failing that, for a polyhedron with a circumscribed sphere, inscribed sphere, or midsphere (one with all edges as tangents), this can be used. However, it is possible to reciprocate a polyhedron about any sphere, and the resulting form of the dual will depend on the size and position of the sphere; as the sphere is varied, so too is the dual form. The choice of center for the sphere is sufficient to define the dual up to similarity.

If a polyhedron in Euclidean space has a face plane, edge line, or vertex lying on the center of the sphere, the corresponding element of its dual will go to infinity. Since Euclidean space never reaches infinity, the projective equivalent, called extended Euclidean space, may be formed by adding the required 'plane at infinity'. Some theorists prefer to stick to Euclidean space and say that there is no dual. Meanwhile,  found a way to represent these infinite duals, in a manner suitable for making models (of some finite portion).

The concept of duality here is closely related to the duality in projective geometry, where lines and edges are interchanged. Projective polarity works well enough for convex polyhedra. But for non-convex figures such as star polyhedra, when we seek to rigorously define this form of polyhedral duality in terms of projective polarity, various problems appear. 
Because of the definitional issues for geometric duality of non-convex polyhedra,  argues that any proper definition of a non-convex polyhedron should include a notion of a dual polyhedron.

Canonical duals

Any convex polyhedron can be distorted into a canonical form, in which a unit midsphere (or intersphere) exists tangent to every edge, and such that the average position of the points of tangency is the center of the sphere. This form is unique up to congruences.

If we reciprocate such a canonical polyhedron about its midsphere, the dual polyhedron will share the same edge-tangency points, and thus will also be canonical. It is the canonical dual, and the two together form a canonical dual compound.

Dorman Luke construction
For a uniform polyhedron, each face of the dual polyhedron may be derived from the original polyhedron's corresponding vertex figure by using the Dorman Luke construction.

Topological duality
Even when a pair of polyhedra cannot be obtained by reciprocation from each other, they may be called duals of each other as long as the vertices of one correspond to the faces of the other, and the edges of one correspond to the edges of the other, in an incidence-preserving way. Such pairs of polyhedra are still topologically or abstractly dual.

The vertices and edges of a convex polyhedron form a graph (the 1-skeleton of the polyhedron), embedded on the surface of the polyhedron (a topological sphere). This graph can be projected to form a Schlegel diagram on a flat plane. The graph formed by the vertices and edges of the dual polyhedron is the dual graph of the original graph.

More generally, for any polyhedron whose faces form a closed surface, the vertices and edges of the polyhedron form a graph embedded on this surface, and the vertices and edges of the (abstract) dual polyhedron form the dual graph of the original graph.

An abstract polyhedron is a certain kind of partially ordered set (poset) of elements, such that incidences, or connections, between elements of the set correspond to incidences between elements (faces, edges, vertices) of a polyhedron. Every such poset has a dual poset, formed by reversing all of the order relations. If the poset is visualized as a Hasse diagram, the dual poset can be visualized simply by turning the Hasse diagram upside down.

Every geometric polyhedron corresponds to an abstract polyhedron in this way, and has an abstract dual polyhedron. However, for some types of non-convex geometric polyhedra, the dual polyhedra may not be realizable geometrically.

Self-dual polyhedra
Topologically, a self-dual polyhedron is one whose dual has exactly the same connectivity between vertices, edges and faces. Abstractly, they have the same Hasse diagram.
 
A geometrically self-dual polyhedron is not only topologically self-dual, but its polar reciprocal about a certain point, typically its centroid, is a similar figure. For example, the dual of a regular tetrahedron is another regular tetrahedron, reflected through the origin.

Every polygon (that is, a two-dimensional polyhedron) is topologically self-dual, since it has the same number of vertices as edges, and these are switched by duality. But it is not necessarily self-dual (up to rigid motion, for instance). Every polygon has a regular form which is geometrically self-dual about its intersphere: all angles are congruent, as are all edges, so under duality these congruences swap.

Similarly, every topologically self-dual convex polyhedron can be realized by an equivalent geometrically self-dual polyhedron, its canonical polyhedron, reciprocal about the center of the midsphere.

There are infinitely many geometrically self-dual polyhedra. The simplest infinite family are the canonical pyramids of n sides. Another infinite family, elongated pyramids, consists of polyhedra that can be roughly described as a pyramid sitting on top of a prism (with the same number of sides). Adding a frustum (pyramid with the top cut off) below the prism generates another infinite family, and so on.

There are many other convex, self-dual polyhedra. For example, there are 6 different ones with 7 vertices, and 16 with 8 vertices.

A self-dual non-convex icosahedron with hexagonal faces was identified by Brückner in 1900. Other non-convex self-dual polyhedra have been found, under certain definitions of non-convex polyhedra and their duals.

Dual polytopes and tessellations
Duality can be generalized to n-dimensional space and dual polytopes; in two dimension these are called dual polygons.

The vertices of one polytope correspond to the (n − 1)-dimensional elements, or facets, of the other, and the j points that define a (j − 1)-dimensional element will correspond to j hyperplanes that intersect to give a (n − j)-dimensional element. The dual of an n-dimensional tessellation or honeycomb can be defined similarly.

In general, the facets of a polytope's dual will be the topological duals of the polytope's vertex figures. For the polar reciprocals of the regular and uniform polytopes, the dual facets will be polar reciprocals of the original's vertex figure. For example, in four dimensions, the vertex figure of the 600-cell is the icosahedron;  the dual of the 600-cell is the 120-cell, whose facets are dodecahedra, which are the dual of the icosahedron.

Self-dual polytopes and tessellations

The primary class of self-dual polytopes are regular polytopes with palindromic Schläfli symbols. All regular polygons, {a} are self-dual, polyhedra of the form {a,a}, 4-polytopes of the form {a,b,a}, 5-polytopes of the form {a,b,b,a}, etc.

The self-dual regular polytopes are:

 All regular polygons, {a}.
 Regular tetrahedron: {3,3}
 In general, all regular n-simplexes, {3,3,...,3}
 The regular 24-cell in 4 dimensions, {3,4,3}.
 The great 120-cell {5,5/2,5} and the grand stellated 120-cell {5/2,5,5/2}
The self-dual (infinite) regular Euclidean honeycombs are:
 Apeirogon: {∞}
 Square tiling: {4,4}
 Cubic honeycomb: {4,3,4}
 In general, all regular n-dimensional Euclidean hypercubic honeycombs: {4,3,...,3,4}.
The self-dual (infinite) regular hyperbolic honeycombs are:
 Compact hyperbolic tilings: {5,5}, {6,6}, ... {p,p}.
 Paracompact hyperbolic tiling: {∞,∞}
 Compact hyperbolic honeycombs: {3,5,3}, {5,3,5}, and {5,3,3,5}
 Paracompact hyperbolic honeycombs: {3,6,3}, {6,3,6}, {4,4,4}, and {3,3,4,3,3}

See also
 Conway polyhedron notation
 Dual polygon
 Self-dual graph
 Self-dual polygon

References

Notes

Bibliography

.
.
.
.
.
 .
.

External links
 
 
 

Polyhedra
Polyhedron
 
Polytopes